How to Prepare for Climate Change: A Practical Guide to Surviving the Chaos is a 2021 book by David Pogue, a science and technology writer best known for his work on CBS News Sunday Morning.

Pogue describes the impact of climate change in various locations, climate mitigation efforts by individuals and businesses, and practical topics such as the business and insurance aspects of climate resilience, personal disaster preparedness, and political and social participation in climate action.

Reception 
Positive reviews have appeared in Booklist, Kirkus Reviews, and The New York Times.

See also 
 How to Live a Low-Carbon Life
Drawdown (book)

References

External links
 

2021 non-fiction books
Climate change mitigation
Climate change books
Self-help books
2021 in the environment
Simon & Schuster books